Karl-Adolf Zenker (19 July 1907 – 27 March 1998) was an officer in the Kriegsmarine during World War II. He served as a member of the Naval Historical Team and later became commander (Inspector of the Navy) of the post-war German Navy.

References 
 Sander-Nagashima, Johannes Berthold (2006). Die Bundesmarine 1955 bis 1972: Konzeption und Aufbau. München, Germany: Oldenbourg Verlag. .

External links
 
 
 

1907 births
1998 deaths
Reichsmarine personnel
Kriegsmarine personnel
Bundesmarine admirals
Knights Commander of the Order of Merit of the Federal Republic of Germany
Recipients of the Knights Cross of the War Merit Cross
Vice admirals of the German Navy
Chiefs of Navy (Germany)